Mount Amorong a potentially active lava dome, part of the Amorong Volcanic Group, is located at the northern end of the Luzon Central Plain, in Umingan, Pangasinan, Region I, on the island of Luzon, in the Philippines.

Physical features

Amorong is one of a cluster of small lava domes and diatremes. It is the only one which currently exhibits any volcanic-related activities, being fumarolic and solfataric.

Listings

Philippine Institute of Volcanology and Seismology (PHIVOLCS) lists Amorong as Potentially active volcano.

The Smithsonian Institution lists Amorong as Fumarolic.

Eruptions

Date of the last eruption is unknown but possibly more than 1 million years before present.

Geology

Rock type is principally trachyandesite.

K-Ar dating of about 1.14 million years was obtained from the Amorong volcanic group.

It lies along the Eastern Bataan volcanic lineament of the Philippines.

See also
List of active volcanoes in the Philippines
List of potentially active volcanoes in the Philippines
List of inactive volcanoes in the Philippines
Pacific Ring of Fire

References

Subduction volcanoes
Volcanoes of Luzon
Volcanic groups
Diatremes of the Philippines
Mountains of the Philippines
Potentially active volcanoes of the Philippines
Landforms of Pangasinan
Pleistocene lava domes